Letter of 34 – two-sentence protest letter of Polish intellectuals against censorship in Communist Poland, addressed to the Prime Minister Józef Cyrankiewicz, delivered on 14 March 1964 to  by Antoni Słonimski. The name refers to the number of signatories.

The letter

Original 
Do Prezesa Rady Ministrów
Józefa Cyrankiewicza

Ograniczenia przydziału papieru na druk książek i czasopism oraz zaostrzenie cenzury prasowej stwarza sytuację zagrażającą rozwojowi kultury narodowej. Niżej podpisani, uznając istnienie opinii publicznej, prawa do krytyki, swobodnej dyskusji i rzetelnej informacji za konieczny element postępu, powodowani troską obywatelską, domagają się zmiany polskiej polityki kulturalnej w duchu praw zagwarantowanych przez konstytucję państwa polskiego i zgodnych z dobrem narodu.

Translation to English 
To the Prime Minister
Józef Cyrankiewicz

Restrictions on the allocation of paper for printing books and magazines and the tightening of press censorship create a situation that threatens the development of national culture. The undersigned, recognizing the existence of public opinion, the right to criticism, free discussion and reliable information as a necessary element of progress, driven by civic concern, demand a change in Polish cultural policy in the spirit of rights guaranteed by the constitution of the Polish state and compatible with the good of the nation.

Signatories 
 Jerzy Andrzejewski
 Maria Dąbrowska
 Stanisław Dygat
 Karol Estreicher
 
 Aleksander Gieysztor
 
 Paweł Hertz
 Leopold Infeld
 Paweł Jasienica
 Mieczysław Jastrun
 Stefan Kisielewski
 Zofia Kossak-Szczucka
 Tadeusz Kotarbiński
 Jan Kott
 Anna Kowalska
 Julian Krzyżanowski
 
 Edward Lipiński
 Maria Ossowska
 Stanisław Cat Mackiewicz
 Jan Parandowski
 
 Adolf Rudnicki
 Artur Sandauer
 Wacław Sierpiński
 Antoni Słonimski
 Jan Szczepański
 Władysław Tatarkiewicz
 Jerzy Turowicz
 Melchior Wańkowicz
 Adam Ważyk
 Kazimierz Wyka
 Jerzy Zagórski.

The author of the text was Antoni Słonimski, Jan Józef Lipski co-organized signing the letter.

Reception 
The letter caused a reaction in the West. The Times published a letter criticizing the authorities of the Polish People's Republic, signed by 21 British writers and artists, including Arthur Koestler and Alan Bullock. In addition, 15 Italian intellectuals including Alberto Moravia and 13 Harvard professors defended the signatories.

The letter caused a harassment and repression of its signatories and Tygodnik Powszechny by the authorities. Melchior Wańkowicz, was the most severely repressed - he was arrested and was accused of preparing and forwarding a text containing "false information slandering People's Poland". The writer was convicted and sentenced to serving an absolute prison sentence. Communist authorities, wanting to avoid discredit, did not allow the execution of the sentence (first, in fact, later the execution of the ruling was formally suspended).

From 34 signatories of the Letter Konrad Górski withdrew his signature, after which he wrote a letter to Prime Minister Cyrankiewicz, in which he blamed Jerzy Turowicz on drawing him into the matter. This letter was read by Zenon Kliszko at a meeting of the Writers' Union.

Ten of the signatories of Letter 34 then signed another letter addressed to The Times, stating that Letter 34 was to be internal and discrediting Radio Free Europe. The letter was signed by: Aleksander Gieysztor, Konrad Górski, Leopold Infeld, Julian Krzyżanowski, Kazimierz Kumaniecki, Edward Lipiński, Wacław Sierpiński, Jan Szczepański, Władysław Tatarkiewicz and Kazimierz Wyka. 

Despite this, Polish intellectuals were supported by intellectuals from other countries and the letters of support were published in the Italian "Il Mondo" and the French "Le Figaro Littéraire". 13 Harvard professors signed a letter to the ambassador of the Polish People's Republic, and Berkeley professors did the same.

Bibliography 
 Jerzy Eisler, List 34, Wydawnictwo Naukowe PWN, Warszawa 1993, .
 Aleksandra Ziółkowska Proces Melchiora Wańkowicza 1964, Nowe Wydawnictwo Polskie, Warszawa 1990, .
 Aleksandra Ziółkowska-Boehm Na tropach Wańkowicza po latach, Prószyński i S-ka, Warszawa 1999, 2 wydanie 2009, .
 Aleksandra Ziółkowska-Boehm Melchior Wańkowicz Poland’s Master of the Written Word, Rozdział: The Trial of Melchior Wańkowicz: 1964 (strony: 29-103), Lexington Books, USA 2013, .

1964 in Poland
1964 documents
Open letters